Paleoworld (Season 3) is the third season of Paleoworld.

List of episodes (In original order)

Paleoworld